Eva Trout may refer to:

 Eva Trout (novel), a novel by Elizabeth Bowen
 Eva Trout (band), an Australian alternative rock band